The  ('exaggerators', 'extremists', 'transgressors', singular ) were a branch of early Shi'i Muslims. The term mainly refers to a wide variety of now extinct Shi'i sects who were active in 8th/9th-century Kufa (southern Iraq), and who despite their sometimes significant differences shared a number of common ideas. These common ideas included the attribution of a divine nature to the Imams, the belief that souls can migrate between different human and non-human bodies ( or metempsychosis), a particular creation myth involving pre-existent 'shadows' whose fall from grace produced the material world, and an emphasis on secrecy and dissociation from outsiders. They were named  by other Shi'i and Sunni Muslims for their purportedly "exaggerated" veneration of the prophet Muhammad (–632) and his family, most notably Ali ibn Abi Talib (–661) and his descendants, the Shi'i Imams.

The ideas of the  have at times been compared to those of the late antique gnostics, but the extent of this similarity has also been questioned. Some  ideas, such as the notion of the occultation and return of the Imam, have been influential in the development of Twelver Shi'ism. Later Isma'ili Shi'i authors such as Ja'far ibn Mansur al-Yaman (died ) and Abu Ya'qub al-Sijistani (died after 971) also adapted  ideas to reformulate their own doctrines. The only  sect still in existence today are the Alawites, historically known as 'Nusayris' after their founder Ibn Nusayr (died after 868). 

A relatively large number of  writings have survived to this day. Previously, only some works that were preserved in the Isma'ili tradition were available to scholars, such the Mother of the Book published in 1936 (8th–11th centuries), the Book of the Seven and the Shadows published in 1960 (8th–11th centuries), and the Book of the Path published in 1995 (–941). However, between 2006 and 2013 numerous  texts that have been preserved in the Nusayri-Alawi tradition were published in the Alawite Heritage Series.

History

Origins (680–700)

Like Shi'i Islam itself, the origins of the  lie in the pro-Alid movements of the late 7th century, who fought against the Umayyads in order to bring one of Ali ibn Abi Talib's descendants to power. The earliest attested use of the term  is found in a number of reports about the followers of al-Mukhtar, the leader of a revolt against the Umayyads on behalf of Ali's son Muhammad ibn al-Hanafiyya (part of the Second Fitna, 680–692). According to these reports, some of al-Mukhtar's followers organized regular meetings in the houses of various Kufan women in order to listen to soothsayers prophesying about future events. The Arabic verb , 'to exaggerate', 'to transgress the proper bounds', was in broader use at the time to denounce perceived 'un-Islamic' activities, which may include soothsaying. But the use of the term here could hardly have been in reference this, since al-Mukhtar himself often practiced soothsaying, and was respected for this by all of his followers. Rather, the reason for the use of the term  for this subgroup of al-Mukhtar's followers may be more specifically related to the Quranic use of the word  ('exaggerate'). It occurs in the Quran twice, in 4:171 and in 5:77, as follows (occurrence of the word  underlined):

The 'People of the Book' here refers to the Christians, who are castigated for ascribing a divine status to their prophet Jesus Christ. He was not a "child" of God, but "only a messenger" who like all normal human beings "ate food". The Christian claim that "God is the Messiah, son of Mary" is characterized in 5:72 and in other verses as 'disbelief', as is the claim that "God is the third of three" (a reference to the Trinity, in which Jesus is believed to be consubstantial with the Godhead). The Quranic concept of 'exaggeration' in both cases refers to 'exaggerating' the status of a prophet as being more-than-human.

It seems probable that the followers of al-Mukhtar who gathered in the Kufan houses were likewise denounced by their colleagues for having exaggerated the status, not of Jesus, but of Ali.

It thus appears that in its earliest usage, the term  referred to those Shi'is who taught the dual doctrine of the occultation and return of the Imam, which other Muslims perceived as an 'exaggerated' view of the Imam's status. Later sources would also attribute to these earliest  some of the ideas for which the later  would become known, most notably the outright divinization of Ali, but there is no good evidence that this was the case. Nevertheless, the later  did probably originate from these early groups, and some glimpses of later ideas may sometimes be found, as for example the belief in the transmigration of souls which was attributed to early 7th-century  leaders such as Hind bint al-Mutakallifa or Layla bint Qumama al-Muzaniyya. One important difference with the later groups is the prominent role played by women, who organized the early  meetings in their houses and who often acted as teachers, upholding a circle of disciples. This stands in stark contrast to the ideas of the later , who ranked women between the status of animals and men in their spiritual hierarchy.

Uprisings and development of doctrine (700–750)

Bayan ibn Sam'an al-Tamimi

al-Mughira ibn Sa'id

Abu Mansur al-Ijli
Abu Mansur al-Ijli (died –744) was the leader of a  sect called the  who was killed by the Umayyad governor Yusuf ibn Umar al-Thaqafi.

Abd Allah ibn Harb
Abd Allah ibn Harb (died 748–9) was the leader of a  sect called the  who was killed by the Abbasid activist Abu Muslim al-Khurasani.

Political quietism and diffusion of sects (750–)

Abu al-Khattab
Abu al-Khattab al-Asadi (died 755) was the leader of a  sect called the  who was killed by the Abbasid governor Isa ibn Musa.

al-Mufaddal ibn Umar al-Ju'fi

Al-Mufaddal ibn Umar al-Ju'fi (died before 799) was a close confidant of Ja'far al-Sadiq and his son Musa al-Kazim (died 799) who for some time was a follower of Abu al-Khattab. A number of important  writings were attributed to him by later authors (see below).

Ishaq al-Ahmar al-Nakha'i
Some writings were also attributed to him.

Ibn Nusayr and al-Khasibi

Ibn Nusayr (died after 868) and al-Khasibi (died 969) were the two most important figures in the founding of Nusayrism (called Alawism in the contemporary context), the only  sect that still exists today.

writings

Mother of the Book

The  is a syncretic Shi'i work originating in the  milieus of 8th-century Kufa. It was later transplanted to Syria by the 10th-century Nusayris, whose final redaction of the work was preserved in a Persian translation produced by the Nizari Isma'ilis of Central Asia. The work only survives in Persian.

The work presents itself as a revelation of secret knowledge by the Shi'i Imam Muhammad al-Baqir (677–732) to his disciple Jabir ibn Yazid al-Ju'fi (died –750). It contains a lengthy exposition of the typical  myth of the pre-existent shadows who created the world by their fall from grace, as is also found in the  attributed to al-Mufaddal ibn Umar al-Ju'fi (died before 799).

Book of the Seven and the Shadows

It sets out in great detail the  myth of pre-existent 'shadows' who created the world by their fall from grace, and who were imprisoned in material human bodies as punishment for their hubris.

This secret knowledge is entrusted by Ja'far to al-Mufaddal, but is reserved only for true believers. It involves such notions as the transmigration of souls ( or metempsychosis) and the idea that seven Adams exist in the seven heavens, each one of them presiding over one of the seven historical world cycles. This latter idea may reflect an influence from Isma'ilism, where the appearance of each new prophet (Adam, Noah, Abraham, Moses, Jesus, Muhammad, Muhammad ibn Isma'il) is likewise thought to initiate a new world cycle.

The work consists of at least eleven different textual layers which were added over time, each of them containing slightly different versions of  concepts and ideas. The earliest layers were written in 8th/9th-century Kufa, perhaps partly by al-Mufaddal himself, or by his close associates Yunus ibn Zabyan and Muhammad ibn Sinan (died 835). In total, at least three works closely related to al-Mufaddal's  are extant, all likely dating to the 8th or 9th century:

Muhammad ibn Sinan's 

The Nusayris were probably also responsible for the work's final 11th-century form.

Book of the Path
The  ('Book of the Path') is another purported dialogue between al-Mufaddal ibn Umar al-Ju'fi and Ja'far al-Sadiq, likely composed in the period between the Minor and the Major Occultation (874–941). This work deals with the concept of an initiatory 'path' leading the adept on a heavenly ascent towards God, with each of the seven heavens corresponding to one of seven degrees of spiritual perfection.

The philosophical background of the work is given by the late antique concept of a great chain of being linking all things together in one great cosmic hierarchy. This hierarchical system extends from the upper world of spirit and light (populated by angels and other pure souls) to the lower of world of matter and darkness (populated by humans, and below them animals, plants and minerals). Humanity is perceived as taking a middle position in this hierarchy, being located at the top of the world of darkness and at the bottom of the world of light. Those human beings who lack the proper religious knowledge and belief are reborn into other human bodies, which are likened to 'shirts' (sing. ) that a soul can put on and off again. But grave sinners are reborn instead into animal bodies, and the worst offenders are reborn into the bodies of plants or minerals. On the other hand, those believers who perform good works and advance in knowledge also travel upwards on the ladder, putting on ever more pure and luminous 'shirts' or bodies, ultimately reaching the realm of the divine. This upwards path is represented as consisting of seven stages above that of humanity, each located in one of the seven heavens:

: the Tested, first heaven
: the Devout, second heaven
: the Elect, third heaven
: the Noble, fourth heaven
: the Chief, fifth heaven
: the Unique, sixth heaven
: the Gate, seventh heaven

At every degree the initiate receives the chance to gain a new level of 'hidden' or 'occult' knowledge. If the initiate succeeds at internalizing this knowledge, they may ascend to the next degree. If, however, they lose interest or start to doubt the knowledge already acquired, they may lose their pure and luminous 'shirt', receiving instead a heavier and darker one, and descend down the scale of being again. Most notably, they are able to manifest themselves to ordinary beings in the world of matter, by taking on the form of a human and appearing to anyone at will. This ability to manifest in human form the 'Gates' in the seventh heaven share with God.

The theme of a heavenly ascent through seven degrees of spiritual perfection is also explored in other  works, including the anonymous  ('Book of Degrees and Stages'), as well as various works attributed to Muhammad ibn Sinan (died 835), Ibn Nusayr (died after 868), and others.

Notes

References

Bibliography

Tertiary sources

Secondary sources

 (reprint in )

 (reprint in )

 (reprint of four earlier papers published between 1975 and 1980)

Primary sources
Alawite Heritage Series
 (12 vols., collection of early  texts and texts from the medieval Nusayri-Alawi tradition)

al-Mufaddal, 
 (pp. 196–198 contain a critical edition of chapter 59)

 (edition based on a different ms. compared to )

al-Mufaddal, 

Anonymous, 

Anonymous, 

 (Italian translation)
 (German translations of parts of the text on pp. 36 ff.)
 (German translations of parts of the text on pp. 113 ff.)
 (edition of the Persian text)
 (partial German translation)

Other
 (al-Mufaddal's  in vol. 53, pp. 1–38 &  in vol. 26)
 (transmitted by al-Mufaddal)

Further reading

Shia Islamic branches